Port Kembla is a single-platform intercity train terminal located in Port Kembla, Australia, on the South Coast railway line's Port Kembla branch. The station serves NSW TrainLink trains traveling north to Wollongong and Sydney. The station also serves as a stabling location for South Coast line trains.

History
The wharves, mills and factories that today characterise Port Kembla began to develop in the early part of the 20th century. The railway from the main South Coast line to the new port was completed in July 1916, but the only station, Mount Drummond, was at the northern end. Port Kembla Station, at the southern end near the Outer Harbour breakwater, opened in January 1920. Additional stations were to follow: in 1926 at Cringila, 1936 on the southern boundary of the Australian Iron & Steel steelworks (Port Kembla North), and 1938 within the John Lysaghts site.

Electric multiple unit trains began to service Port Kembla Station from February 1986 and the station building was replaced at the same time. Electronic ticketing facilities were activated in 2014.

As a terminal station, Port Kembla also features a small stabling yard made up of a platform road, passing loop and engine siding.

Platforms & services
Port Kembla has one platform. It is serviced by NSW TrainLink South Coast line services from Waterfall and Thirroul. 1 weekday morning peak & 4 weekend late night services go to Bondi Junction.

Transport links
Premier Illawarra operates two routes to and from Port Kembla station:
43: to Dapto
65: to North Beach

References

External links

Port Kembla station details Transport for New South Wales

Buildings and structures in Wollongong
Easy Access railway stations in New South Wales
Railway stations in Australia opened in 1920
Regional railway stations in New South Wales